Flight 160 can mean:
 Pan Am Flight 160 a cargo 747 flight which crashed in 1973 near Boston killing all three crew
 LAN-Chile Flight 160 a 727 flight that crashed in 1969 near Santiago but without injuries or fatalities